James Clarence Harper (December 6, 1819 – January 8, 1890) was a United States representative in Congress from the state of North Carolina for one term (1871–1873). Harper was born in Pennsylvania but moved in 1840 to what would soon become Caldwell County, North Carolina. A Democrat, he was elected to the North Carolina House of Representatives in the special election of 1865, after receiving, in August of that year, a pardon from President Andrew Johnson for his part in "the late rebellion." He was re-elected in 1866. Harper was seemingly elected again in 1868, but the election was later declared illegal.

In 1870, Harper was elected to the 42nd United States Congress as a Democrat or "Conservative," as some North Carolina Democrats were calling themselves at the time. He did not run for re-election in 1872.

Harper was the father-in-law of Judge Clinton A. Cilley. Many of Harper's papers, including almost fifty years of his diaries, can be found in the Southern Historical Collection of the University of North Carolina at Chapel Hill.

This James C. Harper should not be confused with his relative, Captain James Cunningham Harper (1893–1986), who became a famous band director in Lenoir, NC.

See also
North Carolina General Assembly of 1868–1869

References

Congressional Biography
James Clarence Harper Papers
OurCampaigns.com

1819 births
1890 deaths
Democratic Party members of the North Carolina House of Representatives
Democratic Party members of the United States House of Representatives from North Carolina
19th-century American politicians